Indian Point – Golden Sands is a former organized hamlet of the Rural Municipality of Parkdale No. 498 that is now part of the Resort Village of Turtle View in Saskatchewan, Canada. It is also recognized as a designated place by Statistics Canada.

History 
Indian Point – Golden Sands amalgamated with the nearby Organized Hamlet of Turtle Lake Lodge on January 1, 2020 to form the Resort Village of Turtle View.

Demographics 

References 

Designated places in Saskatchewan
Former organized hamlets in Saskatchewan
Parkdale No. 498, Saskatchewan
Division No. 17, Saskatchewan